Motorboating may refer to:

 Motorboating (recreation), traveling using a motorized boat
 Motorboating (electronics), a specific type of radio interference